Louisiana's 30th State Senate district is one of 39 districts in the Louisiana State Senate. It has been represented by Republican Mike Reese since 2020, succeeding fellow Republican John Smith.

Geography
District 30 covers part of western Calcasieu Parish and all of Beauregard and Vernon Parishes along the Texas border, including Vinton, Dequincy, DeRidder, Fort Polk South, Fort Polk North, New Llano, and Leesville.

The district overlaps with Louisiana's 3rd and 4th congressional districts, and with the 24th, 30th, 32nd, 33rd, 35th, and 47th districts of the Louisiana House of Representatives.

Recent election results
Louisiana uses a jungle primary system. If no candidate receives 50% in the first round of voting, when all candidates appear on the same ballot regardless of party, the top-two finishers advance to a runoff election.

2019

2015

2011

Federal and statewide results in District 30

References

Louisiana State Senate districts
Beauregard Parish, Louisiana
Calcasieu Parish, Louisiana
Vernon Parish, Louisiana